Turkansaari is an island in the Oulujoki river with an open-air museum in the Madekoski district in Oulu, Finland. The museum is run by the Northern Ostrobothnia museum.

Turkansaari island was a marketplace for Russian traders in the Oulujoki river. The open-air museum started out when the old church, from the year 1694, was restored on the island in 1922.

Every summer there is a demonstration of burning tar in a pit to produce tar in the traditional way.

References

External links

Museums in Oulu
Open-air museums in Finland